is a former Japanese Nippon Professional Baseball player with the Chiba Lotte Marines of Japan's Pacific League.

External links

NPB

1986 births
Chiba Lotte Marines players
North Shore Honu players
Japanese expatriate baseball players in the United States
Living people
Nippon Professional Baseball catchers
Nippon Professional Baseball first basemen
Baseball people from Kyoto